Bruno Moynot (born 20 December 1950, in Bois-Colombes, Hauts-de-Seine, France ) is a French actor and theatre director.

Part of the famous French comedy group Le Splendid, he is best known for his roles in Patrice Leconte's Les Bronzés and its sequels, and as Zedko Preskovitch in Le Père Noël est une ordure.

He is actually the owner of Le Splendid and the Théâtre de la Renaissance with Christian Spillemaecker.

Filmography

External links

1950 births
Living people
People from Bois-Colombes
French male film actors
French theatre directors